Bourne Castle was a castle in the market town of Bourne in southern Lincolnshire.

A Norman castle was built by Baldwin FitzGilbert (son of Gilbert Fitz Richard, of the De Clare family). In medieval times there was motte and double bailey castle which formed an unusual concentric plan. The castle was destroyed after being used by Cromwell's troops in 1645 and a farmhouse was built on the site. Traces of the enclosed mound and inner and outer moats (forming part of the Bourne Eau) are all that now survive.

The land the castle occupied is now a park, known as the Wellhead Park, owned by the Bourne United Charities and is open to the public.

The first reference to Bourne Castle was in the 1179/80 Pipe Roll. There are other mentions of Bourne Castle throughout its history including the IPM (Inquisition Post Mortem) and the Close Rolls.

References

Castles in Lincolnshire
Bourne, Lincolnshire